Matthias Benesch (born 1968) is a German bobsledder who competed in the late 1990s and early 2000s. He is best known for his third-place finish in the four-man event during the 2000-1 Bobsleigh World Cup championships.

References
List of four-man bobsleigh World Cup champions since 1985

German male bobsledders
Living people
1968 births